Iverson may refer to:

Computing
 Iverson Award, an ACM honour for APL contributions
 Iverson bracket, a mathematical notation
 Iverson Notation, the syntactic basis of APL (programming language)

Other uses
 Iverson Movie Ranch, Chatsworth, California
 "White Iverson", Post Malone's debut single
 Iverson, a bicycle brand of Stelber Cycle Corp

People named Iverson
Iverson (surname), people with the surname
 Iverson L. Harris (1805–1876), American judge

See also
Iversen (disambiguation)